WHMA may refer to:

WHMA (AM), a radio station (1390 AM) licensed to Anniston, Alabama, United States
WHMA-FM, a radio station (95.3 FM) licensed to Alexandria, Alabama
Wiring Harness Manufacturer's Association, a trade association